is a run and gun video game developed by SNK Playmore for the Nintendo DS. It is the seventh and final title in the main Metal Slug series. It marks the first game in the main series that would be released without an arcade version. The game was released in 2008 for Japan on July 22 and North America on November 28 by Ignition Entertainment.

Story
Several years following the events of Metal Slug 4, 5, and 3D, the Peregrine Falcon Strike Force, the SPARROWS, and the Ikari Warriors are once again on a search for General Morden and his army, this time on a giant island landfill that has been converted into a military fortress, in order to stop his latest coup d'état. After having his newest weapon crushed by the heroes, Morden receives unexpected help when a time portal opens up and high-tech soldiers from the future appear to pledge their support. With their advanced technology, Morden is able to further fortify his base, but the heroes push forward despite the incredible odds.

At the very end, the heroes are able to destroy the time portal and cut off the Rebel Army's suppliers. Morden escapes in a giant mechanical Kraken and confronts them over a lake of molten lava. After a long and arduous battle, Morden is defeated and his weapon begins to sink into the lava. The heroes capture Morden and escape via helicopter, but he escapes when the Martians attack the helicopter. The final scene shows the heroes chasing Morden and his men off into the sunset.

Gameplay
There are seven levels and three difficulties: Beginner, Normal and Hard. Metal Slug 7 uses the Nintendo DS touchscreen as a map of the level, making it easier for the player to look at the level and where to get power ups or captured prisoners. The usual weapons make their return from the series including a new weapon called "Thunder Shot", which fires a homing electric blast to the enemy.

Soundtrack
The music in the game was composed by Toshikazu Tanaka, following on from his work on Metal Slug 4, Metal Slug 5, and Metal Slug 3D.

Metal Slug XX

A revised version of Metal Slug 7, titled Metal Slug XX, was released on December 23, 2009 in Japan and North America on February 23, 2010 by Atlus USA for the PlayStation Portable. This version of the game features additional content, including co-op multiplayer and downloadable content. Metal Slug XX was released on Xbox Live Arcade on May 19, 2010; it is also backwards compatible on Xbox One, released on November 12, 2015. The PlayStation 4 version came worldwide in May 30, 2018. Metal Slug XX was released for Microsoft Windows via Steam in January 2019.

PlayStation Portable
 The screen and graphics are not re-dimensioned anymore, like in the Nintendo DS. Additionally, the player can select the aspect ratio of the screen:
 4:3 (Regular aspect ratio with designed borders at left and right of the screen)
 Wide (Fullscreen with the graphics stretched)
 Clear (Classic Neo Geo aspect ratio)
 Rebel Troops reuse their sound effects from Metal Slug 6 (except for Xbox 360/One).
 Old enemies reappear again such as the Mars People and the Hunters.
 Change in items, Slugs, and enemy placement. The Ostrich Slug is added in this version.
 Mission 1 and Mission 6 take place in different times of day.
 Infinite continues to all difficulties.
 A new announcer; bits and pieces of the previous announcers can be heard.
 Reintrodution of multiplayer mode by using ad hoc and online services. Unlike previous games, there is no drop-in multiplayer.
 Leona Heidern as a downloadable character (costs $0.99). She has several gameplay benefits:
 Her Special Action is the Moon Slasher. It can tear down enemies and machinery with higher damage than grenades. It can also nullify projectiles.
 Vehicle Slugs' health is increased from three to four hits.
 20% more ammo on any weapon crate.
 20% more grenades/firebomb. Leona's grenades are her earrings bombs. 
 Leona keeps her weapons upon death. She loses them when continuing.
 Altered challenges are ranking table in the Combat School mode. The Item Collection challenges are replaced by the returning Survival challenge and Super Devil rank. Players can switch characters without quitting back to the challenge list.
 Implementation of Hidden Routes:
 Mission 1:
 Hunter Hideaway: There should be a pitfall/hole before the Di-Cokka and the DANGER barrel. Go there and fight the Hunters.
 Mission 5:
 Deeper Ruins: When you reach the end of the second part of the stage, it says GO right. Instead, go left until you find a Warp Base. Get in the Base and fight UFOs and tons of soldiers.
 Mars People Hallway: Just like the previous entrance but do not go in the Base. Jump over it. You should fight hordes of Mars People in there.

Xbox 360/One
 Achievements (12)
 Sound Adjustments:
 Leona uses a unique death cry rather than using her old King of Fighters defeat sound.
 The Rebels use their old Neo Geo yells.
 The new announcer shouts "Final Mission Start" instead of the Metal Slug 6 announcer.

PlayStation 4/Steam
 Leona Heidern available from the get-go (no purchase required).
 4K and 1080p resolution. The characters in the menu screen have been redrawn.
 New borders for the Clear and 4:3 aspect ratios.
 Scanlines to simulate CRT and Arcade screens.
 PlayStation trophy support (33 including a Platinum).
 Steam achievements (34)

Reception

Metal Slug 7 and the PSP and Xbox 360 versions received "mixed or average reviews" according to the review aggregation website Metacritic. In Japan, Famitsu gave it a score of two sevens, one eight, and one six for the original Metal Slug 7, and 29 out of 40 for the PSP version of Metal Slug XX.

Notes

References

External links
Official website of Metal Slug 7 
Official website of Metal Slug XX 

2008 video games
Atlus games
Crossover video games
Metal Slug
Nintendo DS games
PlayStation 4 games
PlayStation Portable games
SNK games
SNK Playmore games
Video games about time travel
Video games featuring female protagonists
Video games set in Canada
Video games set in the Netherlands
Video games set in Italy
Video games set in Greece
Video games set in Alaska
Video games set in Florida
Video games set in the United States
Windows games
Xbox 360 Live Arcade games
UTV Ignition Games games
Single-player video games
Video games developed in Japan